Black Mountain Ranch is a suburban community in the northern part of the city of San Diego, California. Black Mountain Ranch encompasses  and is located north of Rancho Peñasquitos and Torrey Highlands, south of the Santa Fe Valley, east of Fairbanks Ranch and Rancho Santa Fe, and west of 4S Ranch.

The development of Black Mountain Ranch took over 17 years to complete and was led by Fred Maas, a local San Diego businessman with a background in politics and sustainable building practices.

Black Mountain Ranch primarily consists of two separate housing developments known as Santaluz and Del Sur. Santaluz is the area in the southern half of Black Mountain Ranch while Del Sur comprises the northern half.

Primary access to the community is via Camino Del Sur (from State Highway 56 via Interstates 5 or 15), Carmel Valley Road, San Dieguito Road (from Rancho Santa Fe) and Camino Del Norte (from Interstate 15).

There is a city park, South Village Neighborhood Park, near Willow Grove Elementary School off Camino del Sur. There is also the Black Mountain Open Space Park off Carmel Valley Road, east of Camino del Sur.

The area is served by Poway Unified School District (PUSD) and includes Del Sur Elementary School (opened 2008), Willow Grove Elementary and Del Norte High (opened 2009).

The nearest shopping areas are 4S Ranch (Ralphs, Bed Bath & Beyond, etc.) to the north and Carmel Mountain Ranch (Vons) to the east and Torrey Highlands (Vons) to the south. Del Sur Town Center opened in October 2015 with Target as an anchor. The center features several other businesses and restaurants, including Sprouts Farmers Market and Burger Lounge.

The area is part of San Diego City Council District 5, served by Marni von Wilpert.

References

External links 
San Diego Community Profile
Black Mountain Ranch LLC
Del Sur Living
Santaluz Golf Community
Del Sur Elementary School
Willow Grove Elementary School
Poway Unified School District
Santaluz mountain biking trails
Lusardi Creek Loop Trail
Black Mountain Ranch Community Association
Scouts BSA Troop 667 (boys only)
Scouts BSA Troop 1667 (girls only)

Neighborhoods in San Diego